Charles Monty Roessel is a Navajo (Diné) photographer, journalist and academic administrator. Roessel served as Director of the Bureau of Indian Education from 2013 until 2016. He currently serves as the president of Diné College.

Early life
Roessel earned his bachelor's degree in photography and industrial arts at the University of Northern Colorado in 1984.

Career

Journalism and photography
After graduating with his bachelor's degree, he worked as a photojournalist in Greeley. He left Greeley to become managing editor of Navajo Times until 1987. For two years, starting in 1990, he was vice president, co-owner and editor of Navajo Nation Today. In 1995, he earned his master of arts in journalism at Prescott College. That same year, he published a children's book: Songs from the Loom: A Navajo Girl Learns to Weave. As a journalist, he also contributed pieces to New Mexico Magazine.

In 2004, Roessel's photography appeared in the exhibition "Viewpoints: Native Americans and Photography" at the Arizona State Museum. As a photographer, his work has also appeared in Arizona Highways, New Mexico Magazine, Newsweek, Time, Sports Illustrated and Native Peoples.

Education
From September 1997 to December 2000, Roessel was director of the Navajo Nation Round Rock Chapter AmeriCorps. Roessel worked at Rough Rock Community School from 1998 until 2011, starting as director of community services. He also taught photography and coached baseball. He was named executive director in 2000 and seven years later, in 2007, he became superintendent. During his time at Rough Rock, he oversaw major capital projects funded by the American Recovery and Reinvestment Act of 2009. In 2007, he completed his PhD at Arizona State University in Tempe in Educational Administration and Supervision. That same year, he published a second children's book: Kinaalda: A Navajo girl grows up.

In 2010, he became chair of the Department of the Interior's No Child Left Behind Negotiated Rule Making Committee. He also served on the Sovereignty in Navajo Education Reauthorization Task Force with the Navajo Education Department of Diné Education.

Roessel became associate deputy director for Navajo Schools under the Bureau of Indian Education ("BIE") in 2011. During this time, he oversaw 66 BIE schools on the Navajo Nation. Starting in February 2012, Roessel began serving as acting director of the BIE. In December 2013, he was named director. Roessel was demoted in 2016 after an investigation by the Interior Department's Office of Inspector General revealed he had used his position as director a friend get job in the department and a relative get a job with the Navajo Nation.

Diné College
In 2017, Roessel was named the 17th president of Diné College. His father, Bob Roessel, co-founded the school.

During the COVID-19 pandemic, Roessel invested stimulus funds from the CARES Act to purchase rental laptops and internet access for students at Diné, where approximately 86 percent of students do net have at home internet access. He also created an emergency aid program which distributed over 300 checks to qualifying students to support basic needs. Graduation was also held online.

Works by Charles M. Roessel
(1995) Songs from the Loom: A Navajo Girl Learns to Weave. Minneapolis, MN: Lerner Publ. Group. 
(1996). Navajo Photography. American Indian Culture and Research Journal, 20(3), 83–91. doi:10.17953/aicr.20.3.225476644v811528
with Peter Iverson (2002). Diné: A History of the Navajos. Albuquerque, NM: University of New Mexico Press.  
(2007). Kinaalda: A Navajo girl grows up. Minneapolis, MN: Lerner Publ. Group. 
(2018). Self-Determination as a School Improvement Strategy. Journal of American Indian Education, 57(1), 177. doi:10.5749/jamerindieduc.57.1.0177

References

External links

20th-century American newspaper editors
20th-century American photographers
21st-century American photographers
American male journalists
American photojournalists
Arizona State University alumni
Editors of Arizona newspapers
Heads of universities and colleges in the United States
Living people
Native American education
Native American journalists
Native American photographers
Navajo people
Photographers from Arizona
United States Bureau of Indian Affairs personnel
University of Northern Colorado alumni
Year of birth missing (living people)
21st-century Native Americans